Medial to the pubic tubercle is the pubic crest, which extends from this process to the medial end of the pubic bone.

It gives attachment to the conjoint tendon,  the rectus abdominis, the abdominal external oblique muscle, and the pyramidalis muscle.

The point of junction of the crest with the medial border of the bone is called the angle to it, as well as to the symphysis, the superior crus of the subcutaneous inguinal ring is attached.

References

External links
 

Bones of the pelvis
Pubis (bone)